Kurt Küpper (born 23 October 1948) is a German water polo player. He competed in the men's tournament at the 1972 Summer Olympics.

References

1948 births
Living people
German male water polo players
Olympic water polo players of West Germany
Water polo players at the 1972 Summer Olympics
Sportspeople from Duisburg